Imitation (Korean: 이미테이션; RR: Imiteisyeon) is a South Korean television series starring Jung Ji-so, Lee Jun-young, Jeong Yun-ho, and Park Ji-yeon. Based on the webtoon of the same name, it tells the story of the lives of idols in the entertainment industry, centered around the secret romance between a member of a rookie girl group and a member of the top boy group in the industry. The series aired on KBS2 from May 7, 2021, to July 23, 2021. The drama was Rakuten Viki Originals in selected regions with iQiyi handled Asian territories.

Synopsis
After her dreams of debuting as an idol are dashed due to a tragic incident involving the former member of her group at her entertainment company, Lee Ma-ha (Jung Ji-so) supports herself by impersonating the solo singer La Ri-ma (Park Ji-yeon) at cheap events. She and the members of Omega III are given a second chance at stardom when Ji Hak (Danny Ahn), the former manager of the famed boy band Shax, recruits them to rebrand as his new girl group, Tea Party. Ma-ha suddenly finds herself thrust into the spotlight, using her La Ri-ma impression to gain Tea Party attention from the public—both positive and negative.

Ma-ha repeatedly encounters Kwon Ryok (Lee Jun-young), Shax's most popular member, at various idol events. Despite his successful career, Ryok is still haunted by the disappearance of group member Lee Eun-jo (Kang Chan-hee) during a concert three years prior. While initially annoyed by Ma-ha, he develops feelings for her and they start a secret relationship that puts their careers at risk. Lee Yu-jin (Jeong Yun-ho), Ma-ha's close friend and fellow idol, notices their budding romance and determines to protect Ma-ha from Ryok and lead his own group, Sparkling, to dethrone Shax as the top boy band in the industry.

Cast

Main
 Jung Ji-so as Lee Ma-ha 
 The center of the new girl group Tea Party, who is best known for her impersonation of the solo artist La Ri-ma. Originally a trainee at Music Holic, she was persuaded to join Omega Entertainment after a member of their upcoming girl group suddenly dropped out. However, the group's debut was cancelled, and Ma-ha spent three years doing odd jobs to support herself before getting her second chance with Tea Party. She is determined to succeed no matter what, even when her attempts to gain popularity make her the subject of severe online hate. Through her idol work, she frequently crosses paths with Shax member Kwon Ryok, and she begins to fall for him despite rules forbidding idols to date.
 Lee Jun-young as Kwon Ryok
 The charming center and most popular member of the top boy band Shax, which debuted six years ago under NOG Entertainment. He is known for his strong personality, performance skills, and star quality; however, he is still deeply affected by the disappearance of his best friend Eun-jo three years ago. He pretends to be the same charismatic figure he once was, but it is all an act for the cameras. Ryok cares deeply for the remaining Shax members and does everything he can to ensure the group's continued success in spite of his own pain. He first met Ma-ha prior to his debut with Shax, mentoring her in dance. Once she becomes an idol, their paths cross again, but he dislikes her due to her impersonations of La Ri-ma. However, his opinions begin to shift as they grow closer, and he becomes willing to risk everything to date her.
 Park Ji-yeon as La Ri-ma
 A popular solo singer considered one of the most iconic idols in the industry, known for her powerful, sophisticated performances. Once a trainee at NOG Entertainment, she left after Ji Hak suggested that she use her skills to become a soloist instead of joining a girl group. She has embraced the image of a celebrity from a young age, but often finds herself lonely as a result of her lifestyle. Her only close friendship is with Ryok, and she becomes concerned and threatened when Ma-ha's presence in his life begins to grow stronger. Offended by Ma-ha's impersonations of her and worried about losing Ryok, Li-ma tries to find ways to humiliate Ma-ha and drive the two apart.
 Jeong Yun-ho as Lee Yu-jin 
 The main vocalist and center of the rising boy band Sparkling, who hides his ambition and persistence behind his outwardly soft and charming image. He trained at Music Holic alongside Ma-ha and they have been close friends for years. He always goes out of his way to be there for Ma-ha when she is struggling and has harbored a secret crush on her since their trainee days. When he notices that Ma-ha is falling for Ryok, his competitive side comes to the surface. He begins to see Ryok as his rival and becomes determined to lead Sparkling to dethrone Shax as the top boy group in the industry.

Supporting

Tea Party
 Lim Na-young as Shim Hyun-ji 
 The group's main visual. She has an obvious crush on Yu-jin, but he does not notice due to his infatuation with Ma-ha.
 Kim Min-seo as Yu Ri-ah
 The main vocalist and leader of Tea Party. She has a chic, cool attitude and is always looking out for her group-mates. She develops feelings for Lee-hyun after he asks to collaborate with her on a song. 
 Danny Ahn as Ji Hak 
 Tea Party's creator and the founder of JH Entertainment. Once the well-respected manager of Shax, he resigned after Eun-jo's disappearance and restarted his life as a café owner. After three years, he unexpectedly returns to the entertainment industry with Tea Party, determined to make them a top idol group. He has an unknown connection to Annie, a late Omega Entertainment trainee.

Shax
 Kang Chan-hee as Lee Eun-jo
 A former Shax member who was Ryok's best friend and rival. He suddenly disappeared during a concert three years ago, though the news was overshadowed by the suicide of Annie on the same night. His disappearance deeply hurt the other Shax members and led to Ji Hak's resignation from NOG Entertainment. Ryok and Ji Hak are frequently haunted by his memory, and his unexpected return brings unknown secrets to light.
 Ahn Jeong-hun as Han Jae-woo
 A vocalist who is the leader and "mom" of Shax. After Eun-jo disappears, he becomes more mature and protective of the remaining Shax members.
 Yuri Park as Bang Do-jin
 A rapper who is known for his eccentric personality. As a foreigner, he sometimes struggles to understand Korean phrases. He is closest to Hyuk, who he enlists to help him uncover the true nature of Ryok's relationship with Ma-ha when he suspects something between them. 
 Hwiyoung as Kang Lee-hyun
 A rapper and producer. He was persuaded to join Shax due to his idol-like looks, but only cares about creating music. He falls for Ri-ah after hearing her sing.
 Choi Jong-ho as Yoon Hyuk
 Shax's youngest member and main vocalist. Having begun idol training at an early age, he was raised largely by his group-mates. He is greedy for their attention and acts out when ignored, but tries to keep the group cheerful after Eun-jo's disappearance. He assists Do-jin in figuring out Ryok and Ma-ha's relationship. 
 Oh Hee-joon as Koo Dae-kwon
 Shax's dedicated manager who is overworked between managing the group and Ryok's acting career. He cares deeply about maintaining Shax's reputation.

Sparkling
 Lee Su-woong as Kim Hyun-oh
 The group's eldest member and former center. After losing the center position to Yu-jin, Hyun-oh grows cold and judgmental towards him. He vigilantly waits for opportunities to bring Yu-jin down. He was supposed to debut in SHAX.
 Park Seong-hwa as Nam Se-young
 A rapper and Sparkling's leader, known as a "hidden gem" amongst Sparkling fans, whose blunt personality keeps Hyun-oh in check. 
 Choi San as Son Min-soo
 The youngest member who is well-known amongst idol fans for his vibrant pink hair. He is always loyal to Yu-jin. Also known for having weak control of his bowels. In episode 4, group member Seyoung uses the bathroom after Minsoo, only to find it completely befouled. Minsoo reveals he is lactose intolerant in episode 7.
 Shin Soo-ho as Tae-geun
 Sparkling's manager who admires Ji Hak's work and assists him when needed. He is burdened with making Sparkling a success, and disdains Yu-jin's closeness with Ma-ha as a result.

NOG Entertainment
 Gong Jung-hwan as Park Jin-man
 The CEO of NOG Entertainment who dominates the idol industry with his intense business strategies. Following Eun-jo's disappearance, he makes sure to keep Shax on top, though he is privately considering the perfect time to bring the group down and push up a new one in their place. He has a secret contract with Ryok. When Tea Party debuts, he tries to hurt their reputation and spite Ji Hak. 
 Lee Tae-hyung as Department Head Kim 
 CEO Park's second-in-command who handles all of his behind-the-scenes tasks.

Others
 Shim Eun-jin as Byun Jung-hee
 A reporter who runs the celebrity newspaper "Fact Check," who is determined to uncover the truth behind Eun-jo's disappearance and all of Shax's scandals.
 Yeon Si-woo as Annie / Jang Yu-ri
 A late Omega Entertainment trainee with an unknown connection to Ji Hak. She committed suicide by jumping into the Han River, the same night Shax's Eun-jo disappeared during a concert. Her death was used by NOG Entertainment executives to distract the media from Eun-jo's disappearance. 
 Jo Jung-chi as Kim Ha-seok / Ammonite 
 A composer who is Lee-hyun's mentor and Tea Party's producer.
 Kim Ji-sook as Eun-jin
 A talented stylist who works with Shax and Tea Party.
 Nam Jung-woo as Go Ba-wi
 Omega III's manager, who unofficially manages Ma-ha after the group disbands. 
 Choi So-yoon as So-yoon
 The executive of Shax's fan club.
 Lee Hwi-seo as Tae-ri
 A Shax fan club member who assists So-yoon.

Special appearances

 Yoon Jung-sub as a movie studio staff member (Ep. 1, 4–6)
  as the CEO of Omega Entertainment (Ep. 1, 8)
 Jo Mo-se as a Music Holic staff member (Ep. 1)
 Kim Jae-il as the CEO of Music Holic (Ep. 1, 3)
 Sung Hyuk as a best new actor nominee (Ep. 1)
 3YE as themselves (Ep. 2, 3)
 Park Kyung-lim as Broadcast Program Host (Ep. 2)
 Jeon Ji-soo as La Ri-ma's manager (Ep. 2, 3, 4)
 Joo Young-hoon as F Reze (Ep. 3, 4)
Shim Yu-seung as the Music Arena director (Ep. 4) 
 Seo Ji-hoon as Yoon Bin (Ep. 8)
 Yoon Yoo-sun as Lee Ma-ha's mother

Episodes

Production
In October 2020, it was announced that the popular webtoon by Park Kyung-ran Imitation would be made into a television series with Jung Ji-so, Lee Jun-young, Park Ji-yeon, and Jeong Yun-ho in lead roles. Imitation marks director Han Hyun-hee and screenwriters Choi Sun-young and Kim Min-jung's second collaboration after Rookie Historian Goo Hae-ryung (2019). In March 2021, it was announced that Imitation would be moving its first air date up from late May to the beginning of the month, in order to fill the empty time-slot left by the indefinite postponement of the drama Dear. M.

Promotion
As part of the program's promotional campaign KBS created social media accounts on Instagram and Twitter for Shax, Sparkling, and Tea Party, posting photos, interviews, and other special content related to the characters, as though they were real groups. The posts sometimes reference events that occur in recent episodes of the show. Additionally, the actors portraying members of Tea Party and Shax were slated to perform and be interviewed on Music Bank in-character, promoting their singles "Show Me" and "Malo" respectively. Each of the three groups, as well as the character La Ri-ma, are set to release individual mini-albums of their in-show songs.

Original soundtrack

Singles 
The following is the track list of singles from Imitation: Original Soundtrack.

Malo (Imitation X Shax)

Call Me (8282119) (Imitation X Omega III)

No Answer (Imitation X La Lima)

Show Me (Imitation X Tea Party)

Diamond (Imitation X Sparkling)

If We Were (Imitation X Maha)

Reception

Commercial performance
With 0.8% ratings, Imitation recorded lowest ratings for KBS2's drama, tied with 2020 drama Welcome, and second lowest overall for free TV behind MBC's Dae Jang Geum Is Watching with 0.7% in 2018. On the 6th episode Imitation recorded 0.4% ratings, the lowest of all time.

The drama however, was well-received among the interational audiance. It received a rating of 9,5% on its online streaming service Rakuten Viki ranked among the most popular dramas on the platform during its two-month run.

Ratings

Accolades

Awards & nominations

Listicles

Notes

References

External links
  
 Imitation at Hidden Sequence 
 
 
 Imitation (English) at Tappytoon

Korean-language television shows
Korean Broadcasting System television dramas
2021 South Korean television series debuts
Television shows based on South Korean webtoons
Television series by Hidden Sequence
South Korean musical television series